Anthony George Kappen (April 13, 1919 – December 18, 1993) was an American professional basketball player.

A 5'10" guard who did not attend college and had previously attended Forest Hills High School in Queens, Kappen played for the Boston Celtics and the Pittsburgh Ironmen during the 1946–47 BAA season. He averaged 6.5 points per game during the season on 23.8% shooting. Kappen and Celtics teammate Connie Simmons were the first players in the BAA (later known as the NBA) who did not have any college experience. Kappen had previously played in the American Basketball League for the New York Gothams and Brooklyn Gothams.

Celtics PR director Howie McHugh said that Kappen "was one of the few guys [on the 1946–47 Celtics] who were serious about playing". However, Kappen was traded midseason to the Pittsburgh Ironmen for Moe Becker, who had become available after a falling-out with his coach.

BAA career statistics

Regular season

References

External links

1919 births
1993 deaths
American Basketball League (1925–1955) players
American men's basketball players
Boston Celtics players
Forest Hills High School (New York) alumni
Guards (basketball)
Pittsburgh Ironmen players